OOCL Hong Kong was the largest container ship ever built at the time she was delivered in 2017, and the third container ship to surpass the 20,000 twenty-foot equivalent unit (TEU) threshold. She is also the first ship to surpass the 21,000 TEU mark. She is the lead ship of the G class, of which five other ships were built. She was built at the Samsung Heavy Industries, Geoje, shipyard with yard number 2172 and was christened and delivered in May 2017, only two months after the christening of the first ship to break the 20,000 TEU barrier, . The six ships of the G-class were built within the same year at the same shipyard.

Design
OOCL Hong Kong has a capacity of 21,413 TEUs, which are arranged in 23 rows. She also carries  of fuel. Machinery on deck includes ten 35-tonne tension force electrically driven, double-drum mooring winches and two combined electrically driven anchor windlasses for raising and lowering the anchor and its  caliber chain. Power for onboard machinery is provided by four 4,300 kW generator sets and two bow thrusters.

OOCL Hong Kong is powered by an inline two-stroke, 11-cylinder MAN Diesel & Turbo (MDT) G-type 11G95ME-C9 engine, which generates  of power at 79 RPM.

Service
OOCL Hong Kong and her sister ships—OOCL Japan, and —serve the route from East Asia to Northern Europe  calling at Shanghai, Ningbo, Xiamen, Yantian, Singapore, via Suez Canal, Felixstowe, Rotterdam and Gdańsk; returning via Wilhelmshaven, Felixstowe, via Suez Canal, Singapore, Yantian, and Shanghai in a 77-day round trip.

See also

References

External links

Merchant ships of Hong Kong
Container ships
Ships of the Orient Overseas Container Line
2016 ships